Knud Blak Jensen (10 August 1925 – 22 July 1980) was a Danish footballer. He was part of Denmark's squad at the 1952 Summer Olympics, but he did not play in any matches.

References

1925 births
1980 deaths
Association football defenders
Danish men's footballers
Kjøbenhavns Boldklub players